Thomas Reddy (23 July 1929 – 27 May 1992) was an Irish boxer. He competed in the men's featherweight event at the 1952 Summer Olympics.

References

1929 births
1992 deaths
Irish male boxers
Olympic boxers of Ireland
Boxers at the 1952 Summer Olympics
Featherweight boxers